Return to Innocence is a 2001 independent film directed by Rocky Costanzo and starring Richard Meese and Andrew Martin. The film is about Glen Erskine (Richard Meese), who gets caught up in a child sex abuse case with Tommy Jackson (Andrew Martin).  The screenplay for Return to Innocence was written by Gary M. Frazier and is based on his novel of the same title.

Plot
Erksine, a family man, is the director and chief of staff of New Horizons, a group home and counseling center for abused boys. Glen is a child psychologist who meets a new patient named Tommy Jackson, who is a victim of emotional, physical, and sexual abuse.

At New Horizons, Tommy's life finally seems to be coming together, until it is revealed that he is being molested by one of the counselors. Tommy accuses Erskine, the one he believes is responsible, and brings him to court in a high-profile child sex abuse scandal.

External links
Official site of LifeLine Entertainment.
Official site of Return to Innocence.
.

2001 films
American drama films
American LGBT-related films
2001 drama films
LGBT-related drama films
2001 LGBT-related films
2000s English-language films
2000s American films